Nils Rütten (born 20 July 1995) is a German former professional footballer who played as a defensive midfielder.

Career
Rütten made his professional debut for Eintracht Braunschweig in the 3. Liga on 16 February 2019, coming on as a substitute in the 87th minute for Marcel Bär in the 3–1 away win against Fortuna Köln.

He retired at the age of 23 after the 2018–19 season and began studying law at university.

References

External links
 
 
 

1995 births
Living people
People from Würselen
Sportspeople from Cologne (region)
German footballers
Footballers from North Rhine-Westphalia
Association football midfielders
3. Liga players
Regionalliga players
Borussia Mönchengladbach II players
Bonner SC players
Eintracht Braunschweig players